The 1958 Kansas gubernatorial election was held on November 4, 1958. Incumbent Democrat George Docking defeated Republican nominee Clyde M. Reed Jr. with 56.46% of the vote.

Primary elections
Primary elections were held on August 5, 1958.

Republican primary

Candidates
Clyde M. Reed Jr., Newspaper publisher
Fred Hall, former Governor
John S. Stevens	
Walter L. Cherry	
Harvey F. Crouch

Results

General election

Candidates
Major party candidates
George Docking, Democratic
Clyde M. Reed Jr., Republican

Other candidates
Warren C. Martin, Prohibition

Results

References

1958
Kansas
Gubernatorial
November 1958 events in the United States